Kreshnik Krasniqi (born 22 December 2000) is a professional footballer who plays as a midfielder for Norwegian club Strømsgodset. Born in Norway, he has represented that nation and Kosovo at youth international levels.

Club career

Hønefoss
On 25 May 2015, Krasniqi made his debut with his hometown club Hønefoss in a 1–3 away win against Nest-Sotra after coming on as a substitute at 86th minute in place of Kevin Beugré.

Strømsgodset
On 17 June 2020, Krasniqi was named as a Strømsgodset substitute for the first time in a Eliteserien match against IK Start. His debut with Strømsgodset came four days later in a 1–0 home win against Odd after coming on as a substitute at 65th minute in place of Ipalibo Jack.

International career

Norway

Under-16
In January 2016, Krasniqi was named as part of the Norway U16 squad for 2016 Mercedes-Benz Aegean Cup. On 18 January 2016, he made his debut with Norway U16 in 2016 Mercedes-Benz Aegean Cup group stage match against Czech Republic U16 after being named in the starting line-up.

Kosovo

Under-19
On 2 October 2018, Krasniqi was named as part of the Kosovo U19 squad for 2019 UEFA European Under-19 Championship qualifications. On 10 October 2018, he made his debut with Kosovo U19 in 2019 UEFA European Under-19 Championship qualifications match against Austria U19 after being named in the starting line-up.

Under-21
On 27 May 2019, Krasniqi received a call-up from Kosovo U21 for 2021 UEFA European Under-21 Championship qualification matches against Andorra U21 and Turkey U21. On 6 June 2019, he made his debut with Kosovo U21 in 2021 UEFA European Under-21 Championship qualification match against Andorra U21 after coming on as a substitute at 83rd minute in place of Kreshnik Hajrizi.

Personal life
Krasniqi was born in Hønefoss, Norway to Kosovo Albanian parents from Gjakova.

Career statistics

Club

References

External links

2000 births
Living people
People from Ringerike (municipality)
Kosovan footballers
Kosovo youth international footballers
Kosovo under-21 international footballers
Norwegian footballers
Norway youth international footballers
Norwegian people of Kosovan descent
Norwegian people of Albanian descent
Association football midfielders
Norwegian First Division players
Hønefoss BK players
Norwegian Third Division players
Eliteserien players
Strømsgodset Toppfotball players
Sportspeople from Viken (county)